Gavin Wigglesworth, known professionally as Gavin James, is an Irish singer-songwriter. In March 2013 and March 2016, he won two Choice Music Prize Irish Song of the Year award.

Early life
Gavin was born in Dublin on 5 July 1991 and grew up in a household surrounded by music. Gavins' dad would play Cat Stevens, Sam Cooke and Bob Dylan whilst his sister Emma sang and toured with a musical in Ireland. James' great-grandparents were opera singers and his grandfather was a stand-up comedian and whistler.

James began playing music in a rock band at the age of 8 and writing his own songs. The rock band was short lived, after a falling out over an alleged "paranormal experience". However James continued to perform solo, playing numerous gigs for years and building his audience. By age 21 he had begun focusing on his songwriting and playing open mic nights. In 2013, James independently released the single "Say Hello", which won the Meteor Choice Award for Song of the Year. By 2015, James had signed deals with Sony in Europe and Capitol Records in the US.

Musical career
In the spring of 2015, James appeared on US television's Shark Tank and released a four-track EP titled For You. Later that year, he was invited to open for chart-toppers Ed Sheeran and Sam Smith on their respective tours, and released singles including "Bitter Pill" from his full-length studio debut of the same name.

James released his debut album and homage to Alanis Morissette Bitter Pill on 20 November 2015 through Warner Ireland. It was awarded Platinum certificate for sales in Ireland. Subsequently, Bitter Pill has won the Choice Music Prize for Best Single released in 2015.

In May and November 2015, James appeared on James Corden's Late Late Show and Jimmy Kimmel in December 2015. In January 2016 James appeared on the BBC One Show, C'est A Vous and RTÉ and was included in Buzzfeed's and The Sun's 'Ones to Watch 2016' lists.

He has been supporting act for Kodaline, Tori Kelly, Sam Smith and Ed Sheeran on their tours. 

Spotify selected Gavin James to be a 'Spotify Spotlight Artist of 2016,' and he has total streams of over 1.5 Billion. On 21 January 2016, James set off on his debut European headline tour, starting with three sold out back-to-back dates at the Olympia Theatre in Ireland. James travelled back to America to support Ben Rector on his US tour in March 2016. James' cover of David Bowie's "Changes" relaunched the new Virgin Radio UK at 11 am GMT on 30 March 2016, he later performed live and was interviewed for the show.

On 7 October 2016, James sold out Shepherd's Bush Empire in London and he headlined his first arena show at 3Arena on 9 December in Dublin and played to 15,000 fans. James also won the 'Breaking Artist' award at the 2016 Music Business Worldwide A&R Awards on 2 November.

James collaborated with Australian hip hop trio Bliss n Eso on the ARIA award-winning song "Moments" in 2017.

2015–present: Bitter Pill, Only Ticket Home, Boxes and The Sweetest Part 
Work began on James' debut album Bitter Pill in 2015. It was recorded in London and Los Angeles with producers Fraser T. Smith and Cam Blackwood. James said of the album: "I've always wanted to hear how my songs would sound properly produced, but I didn't want them to lose the edge they had live. We recorded the song Bitter Pill first and once we found the sound for that the rest was easy." Bitter Pill was released in Ireland on in November 2015 and was subsequently certified Platinum. It was later released worldwide in March 2016. Album track "22" was later used in the 10th episode of the 13th season of the American TV series House Hunters.

In October 2017, James released the lead single "Hearts on Fire" from his second album. In April 2018, he released the single "Always", which was a radio hit across Europe and Brazil. Third single "Glow" was released in September 2018, followed by the release of James' second studio album Only Ticket Home in October.

In October 2020, James released his album, "Boxes." It reached #1 on the Irish Recorded Music Association (IRMA) charts.

In July 2022, James released his album "The Sweetest Part". It reached #1 on the Irish Recorded Music Association (IRMA) charts.

Singles and EPs
The Mark McCabe remix of "Nervous (The Ooh Song)" has been streamed over 170 million times to date and certified double platinum in Ireland, Sweden, Norway and Holland.

Winter Songs, a collection of Christmas songs recorded by James, was released in November 2016 and achieved over three million streams on Spotify as well as airplay across Europe and the US.

Discography

Albums

Studio albums

Live albums

Extended plays

Remixes
2015: For You (Remixes)

Singles

As lead artist

As featured artist

Other charted songs

Notes

References

External links
 

1991 births
Living people
Irish male singer-songwriters
Musicians from County Dublin
21st-century Irish male singers
People educated at St. Declan's College, Dublin